Steve Strong may refer to:

 Stephen Cepello, American artist and former wrestler who competed in Hawaii
 Steve DiSalvo, American wrestler who competed for the World Wrestling Council and had short stints in WCW and the WWF
Benoît Brisefer, Belgian comics character named in English publications as Steven Strong.